Bad Sauerbrunn (until 1987, Sauerbrunn; ; ; Central Bavarian: Sauabrunn) is the name of a mineral spa and the town in which it is located, in the district of Mattersburg in the Austrian state of Burgenland. The spa was used in ancient times by the Romans and was re-opened in 1847. The town, formerly called Savanyúkút, was part of German-speaking western Hungary until that territory became part of Austria in 1920. In 1921 Sauerbrunn, became the provisional capital of the newly formed federal state of Burgenland until 1925, when the seat of government moved to Eisenstadt.

Population

References 

Cities and towns in Mattersburg District
Croatian communities in Burgenland
Rosalia Mountains
Spa towns in Austria